Pierre I of Beauvau (c.1380– September 1453), baron of Beauvau, La Roche-sur-Yon and Champigny-sur-Veude, lord of Craon, of Sablé and Ferté-Bernard by marriage. He was an adviser for Charles VII, and chamberlain, counsellor, governor and lieutenant to dukes, Louis II, Louis III and René of Anjou.

Biography 
Born in 1380, Pierre was the son of Jean II of Beauvau and Jeanne of Tigny. A retainer of the House of Anjou, he accompanied Louis II to Italy and returned to Anjou in 1414. Pierre was governor of Anjou, Maine, Provence, and captain of Angers responsible for the defense of the city against the English during the Hundred Years War. He was delegated by Louis III of Anjou in 1429 to supervise the renovations to the castle of Tarascon, and captain of the tower of Taranto. Appointed ambassador to the King of Sicily, Pierre was often traveling through the fiefs and possessions of René d'Anjou, particularly in Sicily and Provence.

During Charles VI of France's instability, Pierre was appointed by Yolande d'Aragon, to be a governor to the dauphin, Charles. He spent months at a time with the dauphin both in Angers in 1413, and Tarascon in 1415. With Tanneguy du Chastel, Pierre was instrumental in getting dauphin Charles out of Paris, during the capture of the capital by the Burgundians on 29 May 1418.

In 1453, Pierre led troops of Charles, Count of Maine at the Battle of Castillon. Pierre survived the battle but died in September 1453 from either wounds received during the battle or the plague.

Marriage
In 1415, he married Jeanne de Craon. She was the daughter of Pierre de Craon and Jeanne de Châtillon. They had:
Louis de Beauvau (1416–1462), married Marguerite de Chambley, daughter of Ferry de Chambley and Jeanne de Launay
Jean IV de Beauvau (1421–1503), married Jeanne de Manonville

References

Sources

1380 births
1435 deaths
Medieval French nobility